The Great Northern Railway (GNR) Class N2 is an 0-6-2T side tank steam locomotive designed by Nigel Gresley and introduced in 1920. Further batches were built by the London and North Eastern Railway from 1925. They had superheaters and piston valves driven by Stephenson valve gear.

Some locomotives were fitted with condensing apparatus for working on the Metropolitan Railway Widened Lines between King's Cross and Moorgate.

In service
The N2s were designed for suburban passenger operations, and worked most of the duties out of King's Cross and Moorgate, often hauling one or two quad-art sets of articulated suburban coaches.  These ran to places such as New Barnet and Gordon Hill on the Hertford loop.  They also hauled some empty coaching stock trains between King's Cross and Ferme Park carriage sidings.

They were also a common sight in and around Glasgow and Edinburgh operating suburban services, mainly on what is today known as the North Clyde Line.

Sub-classes
 Class N2/1 built 1920–21, GNR locos with condensing apparatus
 Class N2/2 built 1925, LNER locos without condensing apparatus; vacuum brake, for Scotland
 Class N2/3 built 1925 & 1928–29, LNER locos without condensing apparatus; air brake
 Class N2/4 built 1928–29, LNER locos with condensing apparatus

British Railways numbers were: 69490-69596.

Accidents and incidents
On 12 July 1932, locomotive No. 4738 was hauling a passenger train that ran back in a tunnel at  station and was derailed by catch points. The derailed carriages fouled an adjacent line and a freight train ran into them and was also derailed. There were no injuries. 

The wreckage fouled signal cables, giving a false clear signal to an express passenger train, which ran into the wreckage. A third passenger train travelling in the opposite direction then ran into the wreckage. Two people were killed.

Withdrawal
The first withdrawal was in 1955, and another the following year, but official withdrawals didn't start until 1957. Many of their later duties included standing-in for diesel failures and station pilots. The last thirteen N2s were withdrawn in 1962.

Preservation

One, No. 1744/4744 (BR No. 69523) survived into preservation, and after initially running at the Keighley and Worth Valley Railway and Great Central Railway (heritage railway), now resides at the North Norfolk Railway. It is owned by the Gresley Society, and has appeared in LNER Black, BR Black, and GNR Apple Green while in preservation. The loco's most recent overhaul was completed in 2009, with the engine being given its GNR Apple Green livery at the same time, and is usually based at the NNR when not visiting other railways. The engine re-visited King's Cross on Tuesday 5 April 2016 for the unveiling of a statue of Sir Nigel Gresley, the engine in question was moved to and from Bounds Green behind a diesel since the locomotive was unable to move under its own power at the time.

Models
The N2 was the basis of the Hornby Dublo 0-6-2T tank engine, which was offered in the liveries of all the 'Big Four' companies - despite being clearly one of the LNER N2s fitted with condensing gear for use on the London Underground. Mainline Railways also produced models of the N2 in the 1980s, theirs depicting engines no. 4744 in LNER Black, no. 9522 in LNER Apple Green (9522 was the only N2 to wear this livery, which was applied in 1946) and a model in BR lined black.

Hornby currently owns the toolings for the N2, and released a model of engine 69563 as part of the R2981 London Olympics 1948 set including two British Railways (ex-LNER)  teak coaches, 3rd class composite 1435 and 3rd Brake 24387.

Hornby also produced models of the N2 up until 2005 using the original Mainline tooling in GNR Apple Green as locomotive No. 1763, among others. These models were painted in a slightly darker shade of green than that used on the Mainline model of 9522 in 1983.

Hornby produces the LNER number 4765 in black livery using existing tooling, as R3465.

In fiction
The Thomas & Friends character Ryan is based on a GNR N2/1, specifically 1744.

References

 Ian Allan ABC of British Railways Locomotives, 1948 edition, part 4, page 54.

External links

 LNER Encyclopedia

N2
0-6-2T locomotives
Railway locomotives introduced in 1920
Condensing steam locomotives
NBL locomotives
Beyer, Peacock locomotives
Hawthorn Leslie and Company locomotives
YEC locomotives
Standard gauge steam locomotives of Great Britain
Passenger locomotives